The Western State Hospital Historic District is a  historic district in Bolivar, Tennessee which was listed on the National Register of Historic Places in 1987.  It then included seven contributing buildings and four non-contributing ones.  It has also been known as the Western State Hospital for the Insane at Bolivar, as the Western State Psychiatric Hospital, and as the Western Mental Health Institute.

Its 1889 building was designed by architect Harry P. MacDonald.  Its 1932 building known as the Psychopathic Hospital, later known as the Polk Building, was designed by architect Wyatt C. Hedrick of Memphis.

References

Historic districts on the National Register of Historic Places in Tennessee
Neoclassical architecture in Tennessee
Gothic Revival architecture in Tennessee
Hardeman County, Tennessee